Bihpur a Assembly constituency is one of 243 constituencies of legislative assembly of Bihar. It is a part of the Bhagalpur Lok Sabha constituency along with other assembly constituencies viz. Gopalpur, Pirpainti, Kahalgaon, Bhagalpur and Nathnagar.

Overview
Bihpur comprises CD Blocks Narayanpur, Bihpur & Kharik.

Members of Legislative Assembly

Election results

2020

2015

References

External links
 

Politics of Bhagalpur district
Assembly constituencies of Bihar